Automated Testing Framework (ATF) is a testing framework originally created for NetBSD as a Google Summer of Code project in 2007. Automated Testing Framework is also used in many mobile phone companies to test latest applications or updated OS. ATF can be used to automatize basic and time-consuming works such as clicking and switching applications repeatedly. In addition, daily regression test will increase the chance to catch bugs before the release of new features.

ATF is a software testing framework in which test cases can be written in POSIX shell, C, or C++.

A primary goal of the ATF project is that tests are self-contained and intended to be executed by end users periodically.

It is released under the two-clause BSD license.

References

External links 
 Automated Testing Framework

NetBSD
Software testing
Software using the BSD license